Ihumwa is an administrative ward in the Dodoma Urban district of the Dodoma Region of Tanzania. In 2016 the Tanzania National Bureau of Statistics report there were 11,490 people in the ward.

References

Populated places in Dodoma Region